Veseru is an islet in Penrhyn Atoll (Tongareva) in the Cook Islands. It is on the eastern edge of the atoll, between Tuirai and Takuua. The island was once inhabited and contains a marae, Arahura,

References

Penrhyn atoll